Odd Man Out is an American sitcom that aired on the ABC television network as a part of the TGIF lineup. It aired from September 24, 1999 to January 7, 2000. This show was created by Ed Decter and John J. Strauss.

Synopsis
Set in Miami, the show revolved around fifteen-year-old Andrew Whitney (Erik von Detten), the only male in a house full of females. He is constantly surrounded by his three sisters (Val, Paige, and Elizabeth), Aunt Jordan, and widowed mom, Julia. The episodes mostly revolved around Andrew's lack of privacy and dealing with his best friend Keith's crush on his unresponsive older sister, Paige.

Cast
Erik von Detten as Andrew Whitney
Natalia Cigliuti as Paige Whitney 
Vicki Davis as Valerie "Val" Whitney 
Marina Malota as Elizabeth Whitney
Trevor Fehrman as Keith Carlson
Jessica Capshaw as Aunt Jordan
Markie Post as Julia Whitney

Production
The show was heavily promoted in the summer of 1999, primarily as a last-ditch effort to save the faltering TGIF block, which had been in severe decline since The Walt Disney Company took over the block in 1997. ABC commercials showing teenage girls screaming "EVD!" (the initials of star Erik von Detten) were prominent; at the time, this was the peak of the boy band craze, and this was a common practice. The commercials mentioned very little about the show itself, and did not even mention the name until a few weeks before the show was to debut: a typical advertisement, following clips of girls screaming "EVD!" would follow a shadow of von Detten with a question mark and a voiceover stating "What is EVD? Find out Fridays this fall on ABC." This type of mysterious promotion did little to hold interest in the show once it debuted. The series was canceled after thirteen episodes and replaced with the reality show Making the Band; it was the last new sitcom to debut on TGIF in its original form, and TGIF would itself end at the end of the season.

Von Detten would later go on to co-star in another series, Complete Savages, during a TGIF revival in 2004. That series had an opposite premise in that Von Detten was but one member of an all-male family.

Episodes

External links
 
 

1990s American teen sitcoms
2000s American teen sitcoms
1999 American television series debuts
2000 American television series endings
American Broadcasting Company original programming
English-language television shows
Television series about families
Television series about teenagers
Television shows set in Miami
Television series by Warner Bros. Television Studios
TGIF (TV programming block)